Colman O'Scannlain was an Irish priest in the late Twelfth century: the first recorded Archdeacon of Cloyne.

References

Archdeacons of Cloyne
Year of birth missing
Year of death missing
Place of birth missing